Raja Enga Raja is a 1995 Tamil language drama film directed by T. Vijayasingam. The film stars Goundamani, Ramya Krishnan and Sadhana.

Plot
Raja is an IRS officer who works in New Delhi and is in love with his colleague and friend Prabha. However, during his visit to his hometown, a remote village in Tamil Nadu, his parents arrange his wedding with his cousin - Lakshmi, an uneducated but innocent girl from the same village. Raja is forcefully married to Lakshmi due to suicide blackmail, and thinks that Lakshmi is of no match to him. Raja and Lakshmi leave to Delhi. Prabha gets shocked knowing about Raja's wedding, but understands his situation and accepts it.

Raja feels bad as Lakshmi is not educated and keeps scolding her often for her ignorance. Lakshmi doubts Raja having an affair with Prabha. Lakshmi also does not like Raja speaking with any of his female colleagues which angers him further. Raja sends Lakshmi back to his village and asks her not to return to Delhi. But Raja's parents decide to unite Lakshmi and Raja.

Raja's parents take Lakshmi along with them to Delhi. They meet Prabha and understand that Prabha is a kind hearted woman and she sees Raja only as a good friend. Raja's parents advice Lakshmi not to doubt Raja's character. Lakshmi realizes her mistake and starts trusting Raja. Also Prabha starts to teach some basic etiquettes to Lakshmi. Lakshmi learns English and starts working as a tourist guide in Delhi. Now Raja starts doubting Lakshmi as she speaks with many male tourists. Finally Raja realizes his mistake and patches up with Lakshmi.

Cast

 Goundamani as Raja
 Ramya Krishnan as Lakshmi
 Sadhana
 Senthil
 Manorama
 Vani
 V. K. Ramasamy
 Vinu Chakravarthy
 Vennira Aadai Moorthy
G. Srinivasan
 Nalinikanth
 Disco Shanti
 Sharmili

Soundtrack

References

1995 films
Films scored by Ilaiyaraaja
1990s Tamil-language films